Bust-A-Move Millennium, also known as  in Japan, is a video game developed by Altron and published by Acclaim Entertainment under their Club Acclaim label that was released for the Game Boy Color system.

Gameplay
This game continues using the same mechanics as Puzzle Bobble 4. The game contains a new story mode and two-player-link mode, along with a "Challenge" mode like in the Game Boy version of Puzzle Bobble 4. The controls/pointer can be inconsistent, so the player often has to 'jiggle' the cursor in order to pinpoint where they want to shoot their bubble.

Reception

The game received favorable reviews according to the review aggregation website GameRankings.

References

External links
Bust-a-Move Millennium (YouTube)

2000 video games
Acclaim Entertainment games
Bubble Bobble
Game Boy Color games
Game Boy Color-only games
Puzzle video games
Taito games
Video games developed in Japan